Ian Robinson (17 April 1937 – 30 October 2020) was a British literary critic and English lecturer. He was educated at King Edward VI Grammar School, Retford, and Downing College, Cambridge (he earned firsts in both parts of the English Tripos) where he was a pupil of F. R. Leavis.  Robinson served as lecturer and senior lecturer in the English Department at University College of Swansea from 1961 to 1997 Best known for his 1973 book The Survival of English, Robinson has been a champion of traditional English literature and a critic of what he alleges to be the degeneration of the English language in modern life. With David Sims, he co-founded The Brynmill Press Ltd, in 1970, a company devoted to serious criticism which began with the quarterly review The Human World (1970–4) and went on to publish works of literary criticism, philosophy (including Ludwig Wittgenstein’s Remarks on Frazer’s “Golden Bough”), fiction, and poetry.

Robinson's book The New Grammarians' Funeral was a critique of Noam Chomsky's generative grammar. It was well received by few linguists.

Robinson was a critic of the Matthew Arnold, T. S. Eliot, and F. R. Leavis tradition, as discussed in his book The English Prophets. Along with works of pure literary criticism on Chaucer, he has published much in a category he calls “criticism of language”, beginning with The Survival of English, which includes comments on the language of the media, of religion, of politics. He thinks that judgement is always a refinement of a sense held in common, and in 2008 published Holding the Centre, trying to demonstrate that a number of the Arts subjects have become incoherent by losing their place in the common language. He differed from his mentor Leavis by holding the view that judgement in literature cannot do without Christianity, and he has been a trustee of the Prayer Book Society.

He died on 30 October 2020, at the age of 83.

Books
 Chaucer’s Prosody (1971) 
 Chaucer and the English Tradition (1972) 
 The Survival of English: Essays in criticism of language (1973) 
 With David Sims, The Decline and Fall of Mr Heath (1974) 
 The New Grammarians’ Funeral (1975) 
 Prayers for the New Babel (1983) 
 Richard II and Woodstock (1988) Brynmill Press.</ref>
 The Establishment of Modern English Prose in the Reformation and the Enlightenment (1998) 
 The English Prophets: A critical defence of English criticism (2001) 
 With Duke Maskell, The New Idea of a University (2001) 
 Chaucer and the English Tradition (second, completely rewritten edition, 2004)
 Who Killed the Bible? (2006) 
 Holding the Centre (2008) 
 Untied Kingdom (2008) 
How to Read Shakespeare's Verse (2019)

References

1937 births
2020 deaths
People from Retford
Academics of Swansea University
Alumni of Downing College, Cambridge
Alumni of Churchill College, Cambridge
British literary critics
People educated at King Edward VI Grammar School, Retford